The 48th Annual Daytime Creative Arts Emmy Awards, were presented by the National Academy of Television Arts and Sciences (NATAS), honoring the best in U.S. daytime television programming in 2020. The winners were revealed on June 25, 2021 while the nominations were announced alongside the main ceremony categories on May 25, 2021.

The nominations for both the Daytime Children’s Programming & Animation Emmy Awards and the Daytime Lifestyle Programming Emmy Awards were announced on June 28, 2021. The winners were announced via the Emmys OTT platform on July 17, 2021 for the Children’s Programming & Animation awards and on July 18, 2021 for the Lifestyle Programming awards.

Winners and nominees

The nominees for the Daytime Creative Arts Emmy Awards were announced on May 25, 2021, while the nominees for the Daytime Children’s Programming & Animation Emmy Awards and the Daytime Lifestyle Programming Emmy Awards were announced on June 28, 2021.

Winners in each category are listed first, in boldface.

Programming

Performance and Hosting

Animation

Art Direction

Casting

Cinematography

Costume Design

Directing

Editing

Main Title Design

Hairstyling

Lighting Direction

Makeup

Music

Technical Direction

Sound

Special Effects

Voice Direction

Writing

Chairman's Award
NATAS Chairman Terry O'Reilly presented the Crystal Pillar Chairman's Award to 16 daytime television professionals who "envisioned and implemented procedures that made safe production of media possible during the COVID pandemic." The award inscription reads: "For distinguished leadership in seeking to assure the health and safety of our television industry colleagues during the COVID-19 pandemic".

Notes

References

External links
 Daytime Emmys website

048 Creative Arts
2021 television awards
2021 in American television